United Nations Security Council Resolution 145, adopted unanimously on July 22, 1960, after considering a report by the Secretary-General regarding the implementation of resolution 143, the Council called upon Belgium to withdrawal its troops from the Congo and authorized the Secretary-General to take all necessary action to this effect.  The Council further requested all states to refrain from any action which might impede the restoration of law and order in the Congo or undermine its territorial integrity, the Council then commended the Secretary-General for his prompt action in regard to resolution 143 along with his first report and requested further reports be made as appropriate.

See also
 List of United Nations Security Council Resolutions 101 to 200 (1953–1965)
 Resolutions 143, 146, 157, 161 and 169
 The Congo Crisis

References
 Text of the Resolution at undocs.org

External links
 

 0145
 0145
 0145
1960 in Belgium
1960 in the Republic of the Congo (Léopoldville)
July 1960 events